Kincardineshire was a constituency of the House of Commons of the Parliament of Great Britain from 1708 to 1801 and of the Parliament of the United Kingdom from 1801 to 1918. It was represented by one Member of Parliament (MP).

Creation
The British parliamentary constituency was created in 1708 following the Acts of Union, 1707 and replaced the former Parliament of Scotland shire constituency of Kincardineshire. The first election to a Parliament of Great Britain was in 1708. In 1707-08 members of the 1702-1707 Parliament of Scotland were co-opted to serve in the 1st Parliament of Great Britain. See Scottish representatives to the 1st Parliament of Great Britain, for further details.

Boundaries

The constituency represented the county of Kincardineshre., which had previously been represented by two commissioners in the former Parliament of Scotland. The constituency included the whole shire, except for the Royal burgh of Inverbervie which formed part of the Aberdeen Burghs constituency.

History
The constituency elected one Member of Parliament (MP) by the first past the post system until the seat was reorganised in 1918.

In 1918, the constituency was combined with part of Western Aberdeenshire to form the Kincardine and Western Aberdeenshire constituency.

Members of Parliament 

 Constituency created (1708)

Constituency abolished (1918)

Elections

Elections in the 1830s

Elections in the 1840s

Elections in the 1850s

Elections in the 1860s

Elections in the 1870s
Nicol's death caused a by-election.

Elections in the 1880s

Elections in the 1890s

Elections in the 1900s

Elections in the 1910s

General Election 1914–15:

Another General Election was required to take place before the end of 1915. The political parties had been making preparations for an election to take place and by July 1914, the following candidates had been selected; 
Liberal: Arthur Murray
Unionist: Sidney Herbert

See also 
 Former United Kingdom Parliament constituencies

Notes and References 

Notes

References

Historic parliamentary constituencies in Scotland (Westminster)
Kincardineshire
Constituencies of the Parliament of the United Kingdom disestablished in 1918
Constituencies of the Parliament of the United Kingdom established in 1708